Futile Attraction is a 2004 New Zealand film directed by Mark Prebble.  It is an anti-romantic comedy filmed in mockumentary style.  The movie attracted media attention for the fact that it was largely funded by web donations.

Plot
A film crew are making a Reality TV show about a couple brought together by a dating agency. However, the couple are so incompatible that the crew must manipulate the relationship to get the footage they need for the show.

Randal (Peter Rutherford) is a telemarketer with a passion for telephones who has never quite broken away from his controlling mother; Germaine (Danielle Mason) is an activist who agrees to be filmed in order to publicise the threat a new dam poses to her favourite stream.  During the filming, presenter Dudley (Alistair Browning), who is willing to do anything to get himself looking good on camera, clashes with Anne (Glenda Tuaine), who prefers to ignore their boss's ever-changing scripting instructions in preference to a more objective look at the reality of the relationship.

Production
With limited resources available, the writers chose the mockumentary format for its combination of low budget requirements and comedic possibilities.

The movie was filmed in 2002 over 13 days, however due to technical problems post-production took two-and-a-half years.

The vital fundraising also took time.  Having been rejected for funding by the New Zealand Film Commission, Prebble set up a website to raise money internationally.  In addition to the money raised in this way, he received numerous offers in kind, from professional advice to poster design and band music.

The movie is distributed internationally by Echelon Studios.

References

External links
 
 One News interview
 

Reality television series parodies
2000s mockumentary films
2004 films
2000s English-language films